Tasheh Kabud (also Romanized as Ţāsheh Kabūd; also known as Tāshkabūd) is a village in Ansar Rural District, in the Central District of Takab County, West Azerbaijan Province, Iran. At the 2006 census, its population was 183, in 36 families.

References 

Populated places in Takab County
Populated places in Iran